Alex Nevil (born January 25, 1965) is an American film and television actor. He is known for portraying the role of Rebecca Howe's lecherous young boss "Martin Teal" in the American sitcom television series Cheers. Born in Los Angeles, California. Nevil guest-starred in television programs including Married... with Children, The Nanny and Family Matters.

References

External links 

1965 births
Living people
Male actors from Los Angeles
American male film actors
American male television actors
20th-century American male actors
21st-century American male actors